Richard Thornber (June 1866 – 1911) was an English footballer who played in the Football League for Darwen and Preston North End.

References

1866 births
1911 deaths
English footballers
Darwen F.C. players
Preston North End F.C. players
English Football League players
Association football midfielders